Greg Ayres is an American voice actor who works on a number of English versions of Japanese anime series at ADV Films, Funimation and Sentai Filmworks. He voiced Hideki in Nerima Daikon Brothers, Koyuki Tanaka in Beck: Mongolian Chop Squad, Son Goku in Saiyuki, Clear in Dramatical Murder, Chrono in Chrono Crusade, Yuu Nishinoya in Haikyu!!, Kaoru Hitachin in Ouran High School Host Club, Negi Springfield in Negima, Heihachi Hayashida in Samurai 7, Frost in Dragon Ball Super and Tomoki Sakurai in Heaven's Lost Property. Outside of voice acting, he has worked as a nightclub DJ and even performs as such at anime conventions.

Filmography

Film

Dubbing roles

Anime

Film

Video games

References

Further reading
 
 
 
 Greg Ayres Interview at Anime Herald

External links
  (up to 2006)
 
 
 Greg Ayres at Crystal Acids Voice Actor Database
 

Living people
American male voice actors
American male video game actors
Funimation
20th-century American male actors
21st-century American male actors
Year of birth missing (living people)
Place of birth missing (living people)